John Isaac Friedman, known as J. Isaac Friedman (October 1871 – December 11, 1949), was an American politician who served in the Louisiana House of Representatives from 1908 to 1916 and in the Louisiana State Senate from 1922 to 1924 following the resignation of Charles Milton Cunningham. He represented the Democratic Party.

References

 

1870s births
1949 deaths
People from Natchez, Louisiana
Democratic Party members of the Louisiana House of Representatives
Democratic Party Louisiana state senators
Jewish American state legislators in Louisiana